Saleh Al-Ohaymid (born 21 May 1998) is a Saudi Arabian professional footballer who plays as a goalkeeper for Al-Kholood on loan from Al-Ittihad.

Career
Al-Ohaymid started his career at Al-Nojoom before joining Al-Nassr on 26 August 2014. On 7 July 2019, Al-Ohaymid joined Abha on loan. However, the loan was cut short just two months later and the player returned to Al-Nassr. On 7 October 2020, Al-Ohaymid joined Al-Ain on loan. On 1 September 2021, Al-Ohaymid joined Al-Ittihad on a three-year deal. On 9 January 2023, Al-Ohaymid joined Al-Kholood on a six-month loan.

References

External links

1998 births
Living people
Saudi Arabian footballers
Saudi Arabia youth international footballers
Association football goalkeepers
Al-Nojoom FC players
Al Nassr FC players
Abha Club players
Al-Ain FC (Saudi Arabia) players
Ittihad FC players
Al-Kholood Club players
Saudi Professional League players
Saudi First Division League players